Vedran Pavlek (born 27 April 1973 in Zagreb) is a former Croatian World Cup Alpine ski racer. He has been Director of the Croatian Alpine Ski Team and the Croatian Alpine Ski Pool in the Croatian Ski Association since 1998.

Life and career
Vedran Pavlek is a former Alpine racer who himself participated in three Olympic Winter Games and three FIS Alpine World Ski Championships as well as numerous FIS Ski World Cup events. He was an olympic flag bearer for Croatia at the 1994 Winter Olympics in Lillehammer. Pavlek has also been Member of the FIS Alpine Executive Board since 2008 and General Manager of the Organizing Committee of the Audi FIS Alpine Ski World Cup slalom races in Zagreb since 2005. Furthermore, he led the Croatian Alpine Ski Team at three editions of the Olympic Winter Games (2002, 2006, 2010) where the team won a total of four gold medals and five silver medals. Pavlek has studied business administration and management at the University of Zagreb.

References

External links
Sports-reference profile
Vedran Pavlek - man with a vision

Croatian male alpine skiers
Croatian sports executives and administrators
1973 births
Living people
Olympic alpine skiers of Croatia
Alpine skiers at the 1992 Winter Olympics
Alpine skiers at the 1994 Winter Olympics
Alpine skiers at the 1998 Winter Olympics
University of Zagreb alumni
Sportspeople from Zagreb